"See You Again" is a song written, produced, and performed by American rapper Tyler, the Creator featuring vocals from American singer Kali Uchis. It was released as the fourth single from Tyler's fourth studio album Flower Boy (2017) on August 29, 2017.

Background 
Tyler, the Creator originally wrote the song for former One Direction member Zayn Malik, who turned it down. According to Tyler, Malik "flaked on studio time twice" and he kept the song for himself.

Music video 
The music video was directed by Tyler, the Creator under the alias of Wolf Haley and uploaded on YouTube on August 8, 2018. In the opening scene, A$AP Rocky talks on the phone, as Tyler gets ready for another workday in the close quarters of his aircraft carrier. Kali Uchis appears far away at sea on a rescue boat with other rowers, all of them wearing yellow raincoats. The scene shifts to Tyler on the top deck of the military ship, donning a yellow beret and then flips to Tyler oddly wearing a ghost bed sheet, featuring only the eyes poked out, along with a bucket hat. A tire swings in the background, and when he is unveiled, a swarm of bees attack the screen.

Charts

Certifications

Release history

References 

2017 singles
2017 songs
Tyler, the Creator songs
Kali Uchis songs
Columbia Records singles
Songs written by Tyler, the Creator
Sony Music singles